Graystones Forest is the location in Morrisville, Pennsylvania, United States, where William Penn met with members of the Lenape Indian tribe under a white oak tree in 1682 to negotiate the first land-purchase survey in Pennsylvania.

References

Forests of Pennsylvania
History of Pennsylvania